Favorite Channel is a channel in Southeast Alaska, northwest of Juneau, Alaska, United States. It was named in 1880 by U.S. Navy officers after the  steamboat Favorite (built in 1874), which was chartered by the Navy for surveying work in Alaska, later being used to carry out trading and fishing for the herring plant at Killisnoo. The first European to traverse and chart the channel was Joseph Whidbey, master of  during George Vancouver's 1791–95 expedition, in 1794.

References

Straits of Alaska
Bodies of water of Juneau, Alaska